.tt is the internet country code top-level domain (ccTLD) in the Domain Name System of the Internet for Trinidad and Tobago.

Registration under the above domains is unrestricted and the registry does not require applicants to have a physical presence in Trinidad and Tobago. However, registrants with a foreign address are charged double.

See also
Internet in Trinidad and Tobago

References

External links
 IANA .tt whois information

Country code top-level domains
Communications in Trinidad and Tobago
Computer-related introductions in 1991

sv:Toppdomän#T